Lipovljani railway station is a railway station on Dugo Selo–Novska railway in Croatia. Located in Lipovljani. Railroad continued to Banova Jaruga in one and the other direction to Novska. Lipovljani railway station consists of 4 railway track.

See also 
 Croatian Railways
 Zagreb–Belgrade railway

References 

Railway stations in Croatia